The Glen Campbell Album is a compilation of early Capitol singles recorded between 1963 and 1966.

Track listing
 "Only the Lonely" (Roy Orbison, Joe Melson) - 2:14
 "Same Old Places" (Glen Campbell) - 2:09
 "Woman's World" (W. T. Walker) - 2:10
 "Heartaches Can Be Fun" (Bare, Williams) - 1:50
 "Let Me Tell You 'Bout Mary" (B. Bare) - 2:05

Side 2:

 "Through The Eyes Of A Child" (Jerry Capehart, Glen Campbell) - 2:40
 "That's All Right" (A. Inman) - 2:18
 "Prima Donna" (Jerry Fuller) - 2:29
 "Can't You See I'm Tryin'" (Jerry Fuller, Glen Campbell)  -2:51

1970 compilation albums
Glen Campbell compilation albums
Pickwick Records compilation albums